UB5 may refer to:

 UB5, a postcode district in the UB postcode area
 SM UB-5, World War I German submarine